The personal name Ty, which is often short for Tyler or Tyrone, may refer to:

In arts and entertainment

Film and television
Ty Barnett (born 1975), American actor
Ty Burrell (born 1967), American actor
Ty Glaser (born 1982), English actress
Ty Hardin (1930–2017), American actor
Ty Hodges (born 1981), American television actor
Ty Miller (born 1964), American actor
Ty Granderson Jones (born 1964), American actor
Ty Mitchell (born 1993), American actor
Ty Olsson (born 1974), Canadian actor
Ty O'Neal (born 1978), American actor
Ty Panitz (born 1999), American actor
Ty Pennington (born 1964), American television host
Ty Simpkins (born 2001), American actor
Ty Tennant (born 2002), English actor
Ty Treadway (born 1967), American television host
Ty Williams (actor) (born 1966), American film actor
Ty Wood (born 1995), Canadian actor

Music
TY Bello (born 1978), Nigerian singer-songwriter
Ty Burhoe (born 1964), American player
Ty Dennis (born 1971), American drummer
Ty England (born 1963), American singer
Ty Fyffe, American musical artist
Ty Herndon (born 1962), American country music singer
Ty Jeffries, British composer
Ty Longley (1971–2003), American rock guitarist
Ty Tabor (born 1961), American rock musician and singer
Ty Taylor (born 1969), American musician
Ty Segall (born 1987), American rock musician
Ty Smith (born 1977), American drummer
Ty Dolla Sign (born 1982), American singer

Other media
Ty Burr (born 1957), American film critic 
Ty Defoe, Ojibwe and Oneida performance artist
Ty Templeton (born 1962), Canadian comic book artist
Ty Tyson (1888–1968), American sportscaster

Fictional characters
Ty Harper, fictional character from Australian soap opera Neighbours
Ty Turner, fictional character from the American TV show The Fairly OddParents: Fairly Odder

In sport

Football
Ty Allert (born 1963), American football player
Ty Chandler (American football), American football player
Ty Clarke (born 1953), American football coach
Ty Darlington (born 1994), American football player
Ty Detmer (born 1967), American football player
Ty Disney (1908–1962), American football player
Ty Esler (born 1971), Australian rules football player
Ty Fryfogle (born 1999), American football player
Ty Gooden (born 1972), English footballer
Ty Hallock (born 1971), American football player
T. Y. Hilton (born 1989), American football player
Ty Howard (born 1973), American football player
Ty Isaac (born 1994), American football player
Ty Johnson (American football) (born 1997), American football player
Ty Jordan (2001–2020), American football player
Ty Knott (born 1967), American football coach
Ty Krentler (1895–1971), American football player
Ty Law (born 1974), American football player
Ty Long (born 1993), American football punter
Ty Montgomery (born 1993), American football player
Ty Nsekhe (born 1985), American football offensive tackle
Ty Parten (born 1969), American football player
Ty Powell (born 1988), American football linebacker
Ty Rauber (1905–1949), American football player
Ty Sambrailo (born 1992), American football tackle
Ty Shipalane (born 1985), South African footballer
Ty Summers (born 1996), American football player
Ty Vickery (born 1990), Australian rules footballer
Ty Warren (born 1981), American football defensive tackle
Ty Williams (born 1980), Australian professional rugby league footballer
Ty Zantuck (born 1982), Australian rules footballer

Baseball
Ty Blach (born 1990), American baseball player
Ty Van Burkleo (born 1963), American baseball coach
Ty Buttrey (born 1993), American baseball pitcher
Ty Cobb (1886–1961), American baseball player
Ty Cline (born 1939), American baseball player
Ty Eriksen (born 1984), American professional baseball player
Ty France (born 1994), American baseball third baseman
Ty Gainey (born 1960), American baseball player
Ty Griffin (born 1967), American baseball player
Ty Harrington (born 1951), American baseball player
Ty Helfrich (1890–1955), American baseball player
Ty Hensley (born 1993), American professional baseball player
Ty Kelly (born 1988), American-Israeli baseball player
Ty LaForest (1917–1947), Canadian professional baseball player
Ty Neal, American baseball player
Ty Pickup (1897–1974), American professional baseball player
Ty Taubenheim (born 1982), American baseball player
Ty Tyson (baseball) (1892–1953), American baseball player
Ty Wigginton (born 1977), American baseball player

Basketball
Ty Abbott (born 1988), American basketball player
Ty Jerome (born 1997), American basketball player
Ty Greene (born 1992), American basketball player
Ty Harrelson (born 1980), American basketball player
Ty Harris (born 1991), American basketball player
Ty Lawson (born 1987), American basketball player 
Ty Leaf (born 1997), Israeli-American basketball player
Ty Margenthaler (born 1971), American basketball coach
Ty Nurse (born 1990), Canadian basketball player
TY Tang (born 1984), Filipino basketball player
Ty Toney (born 1994), American basketball player
Ty Walker (basketball) (born 1989), American basketball player

Hockey
Ty Arbour (1896–1979), Canadian ice hockey player
Ty Conklin (born 1976), American ice hockey player
Ty Dellandrea (born 2000), Canadian ice hockey centre
Ty Eigner (born 1968), American ice hockey head coach
Ty Jones (born 1978), American ice hockey player
Ty Rattie (born 1993), Canadian ice hockey player
Ty Rimmer (born 1992), Canadian ice hockey goaltender
Ty Smith (ice hockey) (born 2000), Canadian ice hockey defenceman
Ty Wishart (born 1988), Canadian ice hockey defenceman

Other sports
Ty Capps (born 1983), American professional golfer
Ty Danco (born 1955), American luger
Ty Dillon (born 1992), American race car driver
Ty Gibbs (born 2002), American professional stock car racing driver
Ty Harden (born 1984), American soccer player
Ty Keough (born 1956), American soccer player
Ty Alexander Lindeman (born 1997), Canadian badminton player
Ty Loomis (born 1979), American beach volleyball player
Ty Majeski (born 1994), American racing driver
Ty Maurin (born 1982), American soccer player
Ty Murray (born 1969), nine-time world champion rodeo cowboy
Ty Page (born 1958), American skateboarder
Ty Proctor (born 1987), Australian speedway rider
Ty Tryon (born 1984), American professional golfer
Ty Walker (born 1997), American snowboarder

In other fields
Ty G. Allushuski (born 1986), American sports writer
Ty Carter (born 1980), American soldier
Ty Cobb (attorney) (born 1950), American lawyer
Ty Conn (1967–1999), Canadian bank robber
Ty Cullen, American politician
Ty Gurfein (born 1989), American dancer
Ty Harrell (born 1970), American politician
Ty King-Wall, New Zealand ballet dancer
 Tyrone Ty Lund (born 1938), Canadian politician
Ty McCormick, American correspondent 
Ty Masterson (born 1969), American politician 
Ty Norris (born 1965), American developer
Ty Pak (born 1938), Korean writer
Ty States (born 1991), Canadian supermodel
Ty Tashiro, American author
Ty Taylor (author), American auctioneer
Ty Votaw (born 1962), American lawyer
Ty Warner (born 1944), American toy manufacturer

See also

Tó, nicknames

Hypocorisms